Dendrobium guibertii is a species of orchid endemic to Thailand. It was first formally described in 1876 by Élie-Abel Carrière and the description was published in Revue Horticole. The specific epithet (guibertii) honours "M. Guibert of Passy-Paris, well known in the world of horticulture for his remarkable collection of orchids".

References 

guibertii
Orchids of Thailand
Plants described in 1876
Taxa named by Élie-Abel Carrière